The Women's time trial C5 road cycling event at the 2012 Summer Paralympics took place on September 5 at Brands Hatch. Ten riders from six different nations competed. The race distance was 16 km.

Results

References

Women's road time trial C5
2012 in women's road cycling